2019 in television may refer to
 2019 in American television for television related events in the United States.
 List of 2019 American television debuts for television debut related events in the United States.
 2019 in Australian television for television related events in Australia.
 2019 in British television for television related events in Great Britain.
 2019 in Scottish television for television related events in Scotland.
 2019 in Canadian television for television related events in Canada.
 2019 in Estonian television for television related events in Estonia.
 2019 in Irish television for television related events in Ireland.
 2019 in Japanese television for television related events in Japan.
 2019 in Mexican television for television related events in Mexico.
 2019 in Philippine television for television related events in the Philippines.

 
Mass media timelines by year